De Fleury is the surname of:

André-Hercule de Fleury (1653–1743), chief minister of Louis XV of France, cardinal and Bishop of Fréjus
Charles Rohault de Fleury (1801–1875), French architect
François de Fleury (1749–1799), French officer who fought in the American Revolutionary War
Georges Rohault de Fleury (1835–1904), French archaeologist and art historian
Hubert Rohault de Fleury (architect) (1777–1846), French architect
Hubert Rohault de Fleury (soldier) (1779–1866), French general
Hubert Rohault de Fleury (painter) (1828–1910), French painter
Joseph Omer Joly de Fleury (1715–1810), French opponent of the Encyclopédie, Jesuits and inoculation
Maria De Fleury (fl. 1773–1791), London Baptist poet, hymnist and polemicist

See also
Fleury (name), a surname and given name